The 11th Golden Globe Awards, were held in Santa Monica, California at the Club Del Mar honoring the best in film for 1953 films, on January 22, 1954.

Winners

Best Motion Picture – Drama
 The Robe directed by Henry Koster

Best Performance by an Actor in a Motion Picture – Drama
 Spencer Tracy – The Actress

Best Performance by an Actress in a Motion Picture – Drama
 Audrey Hepburn – Roman Holiday

Best Performance by an Actor in a Motion Picture – Comedy or Musical
 David Niven – The Moon is Blue

Best Performance by an Actress in a Motion Picture – Comedy or Musical
 Ethel Merman – Call Me Madam

Best Performance by an Actor in a Supporting Role in a Motion Picture
 Frank Sinatra – From Here to Eternity

Best Performance by an Actress in a Supporting Role in a Motion Picture
 Grace Kelly – Mogambo

Best Director – Motion Picture
Fred Zinnemann – From Here to Eternity

Best Screenplay – Motion Picture
 Lili – Helen Deutsch

Best Documentary
 A Queen Is Crowned

Henrietta Award (World Film Favorites)
 Alan Ladd together with Robert Taylor

 Marilyn Monroe

Special Achievement Award
 Walt Disney for artistic merit in The Living Desert

Cecil B. DeMille Award
  Darryl F. Zanuck

Promoting International Understanding
 Little Boy Lost- directed by  George Seton

New Star of the Year Actor
(Three way tie)

 The Glory Brigade – Richard Egan 

 The Kid from Left Field – Richard Egan 

 So Big – Steve Forrest 

 The Man from the Alamo  – Hugh O'Brian

New Star of the Year Actress
(Three way tie)

 Forever Female – Pat Crowley

 Money From Home – Pat Crowley

 Hell and High Water – Bella Darvi

 The Egyptian – Bella Darvi

 It Came from Outer Space – Barbara Rush

Honor Award
 Jack Cummings for producer at MGM for 30 years

Honor Award
 Guy Madison for best western star

References

011
1953 film awards
1953 television awards
1953 awards in the United States
1954 in California
January 1954 events in the United States